Muhammad Rafique may refer to:

 Muhammad Rafique (politician, born 1941), Pakistani politician who was a Member of the Provincial Assembly of the Punjab
 Muhammad Rafique (politician, born 1960), Pakistani politician who was a Member of the Provincial Assembly of Sindh
 Muhammad Rafique (mathematician) (1940-1996), Pakistani mathematician